Overseas Nepalis or Non-Resident Nepalis are Nepali people who live outside the South Asian nation of Nepal.

Under the Non-Resident Nepali Act of 2007, Non-Resident Nepali (NRN) (Gair Aawasiya Nepali) means the following:

(a) A person who currently holds citizenship of Nepal, who may or may not have acquired a citizenship of another country or countries, who currently does not reside in Nepal for any reason.

(b) A former Nepali citizen (/"Bhutpurba Nepali Nāgarik") means a person who once held Nepali citizenship (By birth, ancestry blood rights or by other means) and has denounced (legally) his/her Nepali citizenship.

(c) Foreign citizen of Nepali origin (/"Nepali Mulko Bideshi Nāgarik") means a person who him/herself or whose father, mother, grandfather or grandmother was/were a citizen of Nepal at any time and has subsequently acquired the citizenship of any other foreign country other than a member country of the South Asian Association of Regional Co-operation (SAARC).

(d) Nepali citizen residing abroad (/"Aaprabashi Nepali") means a Nepali citizen who has been residing in any foreign country for at least two years by doing any profession, occupation, business and employment except a Nepali citizen residing in a member country of SAARC or serving in a diplomatic mission or consulate situated in a foreign country under the assignment of the Government of Nepal.

(e) Person of Nepali origin is a person of Nepali origin or ancestry who was or whose ancestors were born in Nepal or other nations with Nepali ancestry but is not a citizen of Nepal and is a citizen of another country. A person of Nepali origin might have been a citizen of Nepal and subsequently taken the citizenship of another country.

The majority of non-resident Nepalis reside in India.

The Non-Resident Nepali Association was established by the conference held by 11–14 October 2003 in Kathmandu, Nepal. The seventh NRNA global conference was held on 14–17 October 2017 in Kathmandu, Nepal.

The mother tongue languages of Non Resident Nepalis are Nepali (Khas), Nepal Bhasa (Newari), Tharu, various Kirat languages,Limbu, Tamuwan (Gurung), Magar , Maithili and Bhojpuri.

Activities

NRN are opening business opportunities in Nepal by investing in various sectors such as banking, tourism, hotel, hydropower and many more.

Notable persons
Amrita Acharia, actress
Amita Suman, Nepalese British actress
Anish Giri, chess Grandmaster
Balram Chainrai, businessman 
Bhaskar Thapa, Nepali American architect
Chandra Giri
Daya Vaidya, actress
Deepak Shimkhada
Dichen Lachman, Australian actress
Dipprasad Pun, military
Dona Sarkar, 
Drona Prakash Rasali, 
Gaurika Singh, swimmer
Hemant Mishra
Jal Shah
Jiba Lamichhane, businessman, writer
Kiran Chetry, former CNN reporter
Lujendra Ojha, scientist 
Manjushree Thapa, Canadian writer
Payal Shakya, Miss Nepal
Prabal Gurung, fashion designer
Ram Pratap Thapa, Nepali German diplomat
Resh Marhatta, actor in Nepali film industry
Samrat Upadhyay, author
Santosh Shah, chef
Sanu Sharma, Nepalese Australian writer
Shesh Ghale, businessman
Shriya Shah-Klorfine
Sofia Shah, Danish 
Sudarshan Gautam
Teriya Magar, Dancer
Upendra Mahato, businessman & politician

References

External links
 Non Resident Nepali Association
 Non Resident Nepali Association europe
 Non Resident Nepali Act, 2007

Demographics of Nepal
Society of Nepal